Hatfield is a surname. Notable people with this surname include:

 Abraham Hatfield (1867–1957), American philatelist
 Bobby Hatfield (1940–2003), American singer-songwriter, one half of the duo The Righteous Brothers
 Brian Hatfield,  politician from Washington State
 Callum Hatfield, game developer
 Charles Hatfield,  rainmaker
 Dasher Hatfield, American professional wrestler
 Devil Anse Hatfield, Patriarch during the infamous Hatfield-McCoy Feud
 Dominique Hatfield (born 1994), American football player
 Donald Hatfield, English rugby league footballer who played in the 1940s, 1950s and 1960s
 Elaine Hatfield, American social psychologist
 Ernest I. Hatfield (1890–1977), New York politician
 Fred Hatfield, American baseball player
 Frederick Hatfield,  powerlifter and PhD holder
 Henry D. Hatfield, politician from West Virginia
 Hurd Hatfield, American actor
 Jack Hatfield, (1893–1965) English swimmer and water polo player
 James Hatfield (disambiguation), several people
 John Hatfield (disambiguation), several people
 Juliana Hatfield,  musician
 Ken Hatfield, former American football player and coach
 Mark Hatfield, politician from Oregon
 Mark Hatfield (Georgia politician), State Representative (R) from Georgia's 177th District, first elected in 2005
 Percy Hatfield, Canadian politician
 Reo Hatfield,  politician and businessman from Virginia
 Richard Hatfield, Canadian politician and lawyer from New Brunswick
 Rudy Hatfield, Filipino-American professional basketball player
 Sid Hatfield, Police Chief of Matewan, West Virginia during the Battle of Matewan
 Sidney Hatfield, American baseball player
 Tinker Hatfield, American shoe designer for Nike
 Thomas Hatfield, (?–1381) Bishop of Durham, England
 Will Hatfield, British footballer
 William Hatfield (disambiguation), several people
 Robert Hatfield,  (1942-1994) Navy Captain, Singer, and Song Writer from West Virginia

Characters
 Rober Menzies "Bob" Hatfield, a fictional character on the Australian soap opera A Country Practice

See also
 James Hetfield (born 1963), guitar player with Metallica

English-language surnames